Seedley is an inner city suburb of Salford, Greater Manchester, England. Buile Hill Park is a large park in Seedley.

History 
The area is mostly made up of terraced housing, dating from the late 19th century and early 20th century. It was part of the County Borough of Salford in the administrative county of Lancashire. There was a railway station serving the area between 1882 and 1956.

Governance 
The electoral ward of Weaste & Seedley is represented in Westminster by Rebecca Long-Bailey MP for Salford and Eccles.

The ward is represented on Salford City Council by three Labour councillors: Ronnie Wilson, Paul Wilson, and Stephen Hesling.

Geography 
Seedley is near Pendleton, Salford and Weaste.

Transport links 
Seedley is not served by the Manchester Metrolink or National Rail.

The following bus routes run through the area:
 Route 67 between Manchester and Cadishead (operated by Go North West)
 Route 70 between Pendleton and Eccles (operated by Stagecoach Manchester)
 Circular routes 74 and 75 via Agecroft and Pendleton (operated by Stagecoach Manchester)
 Route 100 between Manchester and Warrington (operated by Go North West)

Notable residents 
Alistair Cooke, the broadcaster, lived on Newport Street, and went to the primary school, as did the artist Harold Riley. Emmeline Pankhurst, leader of the British suffragette movement, lived in Seedley.

References

External links
 Seedley & Langworthy Trust
 Seedley and Langworthy in Bloom
 Social Research and Development
 Seedley and Langworthy Partnership
 Seedley Primary School
 Langworthy Road Primary School

Areas of Salford